Welcome Mountain is a very prominent mountain that is surmounted by three peaks, the highest 2,505 m, standing 5 nautical miles (9 km) southeast of Mount Southard in the Outback Nunataks. Discovered and named by the U.S. Victoria Land Traverse party, 1959–60. So named because it was the first mountain visited by the traverse party after crossing the interior plateau and not seeing any mountains or landmark features for nearly three months.

Further reading
 Gunter Faure, Teresa M. Mensing, The Transantarctic Mountains: Rocks, Ice, Meteorites and Water, PP 109 - 110
 Edmund Stump, The Ross Orogen of the Transantarctic Mountains, PP 17-18

External links
 USGC map
 Welcome Mountain at the SCAR Composite Gazetteer of Antarctica
 Satellite Image

Mountains of Victoria Land
Pennell Coast